Nina Boucicault (27 February 1867 – 2 August 1950) was an English actress born to playwright Dion Boucicault and his wife, actress Agnes Kelly Robertson. She had three brothers, Dion William (1855–1876), Dion Boucicault Jr. and Aubrey Boucicault, and two sisters, Eva and Patrice.

Boucicault's debut was at the Louisville Opera House, and as a child she performed with her father. Beginning in 1892, she played Kitty Verdun in the original production of the hit comedy Charley's Aunt. She was the first to play the title role in J. M. Barrie's Peter Pan, beginning in 1904 at the Duke of York's Theatre.

Boucicault retired from the stage in 1927, returning in 1935 and 1936 in Frolic Wind and Waste, respectively, while continuing her film career. She died at Hamilton Road, Ealing. She was married three times: first to G. D. Pitman; then to E. H. Kelly; and finally to Donald Innes-Smith.

Selected filmography
 Paddy the Next Best Thing (1923)
 Miriam Rozella (1924)
 This Week of Grace (1933)
 Oh, What a Night (1935)
 Juggernaut (1936)
 Strange Boarders (1938)
 Follow Your Star (1938)

References

External links
 Boucicault Family Tree
 Nina Boucicault at IMDB.com
Nina Boucicault at Stagebeauty.net
Nina Boucicault portrait as Peter Pan from Flickr
Nina Boucicault portrait as a young woman in Melbourne Australia sitting

1867 births
1950 deaths
English stage actresses
English film actresses
20th-century English actresses
English child actresses
19th-century English actresses